Ornipholidotos boormani is a butterfly in the family Lycaenidae. It is found in Nigeria. The habitat consists of forests.

References

Butterflies described in 2005
Taxa named by Michel Libert
Ornipholidotos
Endemic fauna of Nigeria
Butterflies of Africa